Curtis Bowers (born 1965) is an American politician, former educator, restaurateur, and filmmaker who served as a member of the Idaho House of Representatives for the 10A district from April 2007 to December 2008.

Early life and education 
Bowers was born in Tampa, Florida in 1965. He earned a Bachelor of Arts degree in business from Colorado Christian University and a Master of Arts in curriculum and instruction from the University of Colorado, Colorado Springs.

Career 
Bowers was a private school teacher and a public school tutor.

In 1995, Bowers opened a fondue restaurant in Manitou Springs, Colorado. He later owned two other restaurants in Nampa and Boise, Idaho.

In 2007, Bowers was appointed by Idaho governor Butch Otter as a Republican member of Idaho House of Representatives for the 10A district.

Bowers has also worked as a filmmaker. He is known for the documentary Agenda: Grinding America Down. The film won the $101,000 grand prize at the 2010 San Antonio Independent Christian Film Festival.

Filmography

Personal life 
Bowers' wife is Lauren Bowers. They have nine children. Bowers and his family live in Idaho.

References

External links 
 Curtis Bowers at IMDb
 Agenda

Colorado Christian University alumni
Living people
Republican Party members of the Idaho House of Representatives
University of Colorado alumni
1965 births
People from Tampa, Florida